Hugh Duffy (November 26, 1866 – October 19, 1954) was an American outfielder and manager in Major League Baseball. He was a player or player-manager for the Chicago White Stockings, Chicago Pirates, Boston Reds, Boston Beaneaters, Milwaukee Brewers and Philadelphia Phillies between 1888 and 1906. He had his best years with the Beaneaters, including the 1894 season, when he set the MLB single-season record for batting average (.440), a batting record that has stood for  years.

He also managed the Chicago White Sox and Boston Red Sox and spent several seasons coaching in collegiate baseball and in the minor leagues. Later in life, he spent many years as a scout for the Red Sox. He was elected to the Baseball Hall of Fame in 1945. He worked for Boston until 1953. He died of heart problems the next year.

Early life

Duffy was born in Cranston, Rhode Island to Irish immigrant Michael Duffy and wife Margaret Duffy. He was a textile mill worker who had taken up baseball as a semipro for weekend diversion. He played a couple years of minor league ball in the New England League before jumping to the majors, starting up in the league's initial season of 1886, and playing on clubs in Hartford, Springfield and Salem, as well as the Lowell, Massachusetts team in 1887.

Playing career
Duffy entered the National League with Cap Anson's Chicago White Stockings in  after receiving an offer of $2,000 from the club. He shortly thereafter earned the reputation of an outstanding outfielder and powerful hitter. Duffy ended up replacing Billy Sunday as the team's regular right fielder.

From 1891 through , Duffy knocked in 100 runs or more eight times. In  Duffy had one of the greatest seasons in baseball history, leading the league with 18 home runs, with 145 RBI and a .440 batting average (see Major League Baseball Triple Crown). Duffy's .440 average is the MLB single-season batting average record. At one point during the season, Duffy had a 26-game hitting streak. During his time with Boston, Hughie and Tommy McCarthy forged a reputation as the celebrated “Heavenly Twins” outfield of the early 1890s. Both Heavenly Twins were named to the Hall of Fame.

He was player-manager for the Milwaukee Brewers in 1901. During the 1902 and 1903 seasons, Duffy was player-manager for the Western League's Milwaukee Creams franchise.

Duffy was a player-manager for the Phillies from 1904 to 1906.

Post-playing career

Duffy spent three years (1907–1909) as manager of the Providence Grays. He made $2,000 in his last season as the Providence manager and The Evening News in Providence wrote that Duffy was paid hundreds of dollars less than any other manager in the Eastern League. During Duffy's three seasons, Providence finished in third place, second place and third place, respectively.

Duffy agreed to manage the Chicago White Sox in 1910. He stayed with the team in 1911. He moved to the Milwaukee Brewers of the American Association in 1912, but he was fired after a season in which the team struggled. He turned down an offer to manage the 1913 St. Paul Saints, saying that he was hoping to work in the east. He coached the Harvard varsity and freshman baseball squads from 1917 through 1919. He also managed the 1920 Toronto Maple Leafs of the International League to a .701 winning percentage—the best in the team's 83-year history, but only good enough for second place in the league.

In 1921, Duffy was hired as full-time manager of the Red Sox, guiding them for two seasons. From 1928 to 1930, Duffy was the head baseball coach at Boston College.

Managerial record

Later life
He died in Boston on October 19, 1954. He had been suffering from heart problems. Duffy's wife Nora died the previous year; they did not have children.

Posthumously
In 2019, Duffy was inducted into the Atlanta Braves Hall of Fame, along with Terry Pendleton.

See also
 Major League Baseball Triple Crown
 List of Major League Baseball batting champions
 List of Major League Baseball annual runs batted in leaders
 List of Major League Baseball annual home run leaders
 List of Major League Baseball annual doubles leaders
 List of Major League Baseball annual runs scored leaders
 List of Major League Baseball career stolen bases leaders
 List of Major League Baseball player-managers

References

External links

1866 births
1954 deaths
19th-century baseball players
American people of Irish descent
Baseball players from Rhode Island
Boston Beaneaters players
Boston Braves scouts
Boston College Eagles baseball coaches
Boston Reds (AA) players
Boston Red Sox coaches
Boston Red Sox managers
Boston Red Sox scouts
Chicago Pirates players
Chicago White Sox managers
Chicago White Stockings players
Hartford Dark Blues (minor league) players
Harvard Crimson baseball coaches
Lowell Magicians players
Major League Baseball outfielders
Major League Baseball player-managers
Milwaukee Brewers (1901) managers
Milwaukee Brewers (1901) players
Milwaukee Brewers (minor league) managers
Milwaukee Creams players
National Baseball Hall of Fame inductees
National League batting champions
National League home run champions
National League RBI champions
National League Triple Crown winners
Philadelphia Phillies managers
Philadelphia Phillies players
Providence Grays (minor league) players
Salem Fairies players
Sportspeople from Cranston, Rhode Island
Springfield Horsemen players
Toronto Maple Leafs (International League) managers
Baseball players from Boston